Elizabeth Ball may refer to:

Elizabeth Ball (politician), Canadian politician and actress
Elizabeth Ball (soccer) (born 1995), American soccer player
Anne Elizabeth Ball (1808–1872), Irish botanist